Amza Peak, in Harghita County, Romania, is the highest peak in the Southern Gurghiu Mountains. It is part of the rim of an extinct volcanic crater.

References

Mountains of Romania